The Kansas Boxed Set is the third compilation from the band Kansas. It was originally released in 1994, and was the band's first boxed set overview of their career, emphasizing only their progressive rock era which was bracketed by the albums Kansas in 1974 and Audio-Visions in 1980. It also includes the new track "Wheels". The release was supervised by all the original band members, unlike the first release of The Best of Kansas in 1984.

Track listing
All songs written by Kerry Livgren, except where noted.

Disc one
 "Can I Tell You" (Rich Williams, Phil Ehart, Dave Hope, Steve Walsh) – 4:20 (1973 demo)
 "Death of Mother Nature Suite" (live) – 9:00
 "Journey from Mariabronn" (Livgren, Walsh) – 7:57
 "Song for America" – 10:02
 "The Devil Game" (Walsh, Hope) – 5:04
 "Incomudro - Hymn to the Atman" (live) – 16:08
 "Child of Innocence" – 4:33
 "Icarus - Borne on Wings of Steel" – 6:04
 "Mysteries and Mayhem" (Livgren, Walsh) – 4:20
 "The Pinnacle" – 9:36

Disc two
 "Carry On Wayward Son" – 5:22
 "The Wall" (Livgren, Walsh) – 4:47
 "What's on My Mind" – 3:27
 "Opus Insert" – 4:25
 "Magnum Opus" (Livgren, Walsh, Williams, Hope, Ehart, Robby Steinhardt) – 8:25
 "Point of Know Return" (Walsh, Ehart, Steinhardt) – 3:12
 "Portrait (He Knew)" (Livgren, Walsh) – 4:34
 "Dust in the Wind" – 3:29
 "Closet Chronicles" (Walsh, Livgren) – 6:31
 "People of the South Wind" – 3:39
 "On the Other Side" (live) – 6:43
 "A Glimpse of Home" – 6:36
 "Relentless" – 4:57
 "Loner" (Walsh) – 2:30
 "Hold On" – 3:53
 "Wheels" (Livgren, Walsh) – 4:32 (new track)

Personnel
Kansas
Steve Walsh - keyboards, vocals
Kerry Livgren - guitars, keyboards
Robby Steinhardt - violin, vocals
Rich Williams - guitar
Dave Hope - bass guitar
Phil Ehart - drums
David Ragsdale - violin on "Wheels"

Production
Jeff Glixman, Vic Anesini - remastering
"Wheels" produced by Ehart, Livgren and Walsh, mixed by Jeff Glixman

References 

Kansas (band) compilation albums
1994 compilation albums
Legacy Recordings compilation albums
Epic Records compilation albums